Cyclopentadiene is an organic compound with the formula C5H6. It is often abbreviated CpH because the cyclopentadienyl anion is abbreviated Cp−.

This colorless liquid has a strong and unpleasant odor. At room temperature, this cyclic diene dimerizes over the course of hours to give dicyclopentadiene via a Diels–Alder reaction. This dimer can be restored by heating to give the monomer.

The compound is mainly used for the production of cyclopentene and its derivatives. It is popularly used as a precursor to the cyclopentadienyl anion (Cp−), an important ligand in cyclopentadienyl complexes in organometallic chemistry.

Production and reactions

Cyclopentadiene production is usually not distinguished from dicyclopentadiene since they interconvert.  They are obtained from coal tar (about 10–20 g/tonne) and by steam cracking of naphtha (about 14 kg/tonne). To obtain cyclopentadiene monomer, commercial dicyclopentadiene is cracked by heating to around 180 °C. The monomer is collected by distillation, and used soon thereafter. It advisable to use some form of fractionating column when doing this, to remove refluxing uncracked dimer.

Sigmatropic rearrangement
The hydrogen atoms in cyclopentadiene undergo rapid [1,5]-sigmatropic shifts. The hydride shift is however sufficiently slow at 0 °C to allow alkylated derivatives to be manipulated selectively. 

Even more fluxional are the derivatives C5H5E(CH3)3 (E = Si, Ge, Sn), wherein the heavier element migrates from carbon to carbon with a low activation barrier.

Diels–Alder reactions
Cyclopentadiene is a highly reactive diene in the Diels–Alder reaction because minimal distortion of the diene is required to achieve the envelope geometry of the transition state compared to other dienes. Famously, cyclopentadiene dimerizes.  The conversion occurs in hours at room temperature, but the monomer can be stored for days at −20 °C.

Deprotonation

The compound is unusually acidic (pKa = 16) for a hydrocarbon, a fact explained by the high stability of the aromatic cyclopentadienyl anion, . Deprotonation can be achieved with a variety of bases, typically sodium hydride, sodium metal, and butyl lithium. Salts of this anion are commercially available, including sodium cyclopentadienide and lithium cyclopentadienide.  They are used to prepare cyclopentadienyl complexes.

Metallocene derivatives

Metallocenes and related cyclopentadienyl derivatives have been heavily investigated and represent a cornerstone of organometallic chemistry owing to their high stability. The first metallocene characterised, ferrocene, was prepared the way many other metallocenes are prepared: by combining alkali metal derivatives of the form MC5H5 with dihalides of the transition metals:  As typical example, nickelocene forms upon treating nickel(II) chloride with sodium cyclopentadienide in THF.

NiCl2 + 2 NaC5H5 → Ni(C5H5)2 + 2 NaCl

Organometallic complexes that include both the cyclopentadienyl anion and cyclopentadiene itself are known, one example of which is the rhodocene derivative produced from the rhodocene monomer in protic solvents.

Organic synthesis
It was the starting material in Leo Paquette's 1982 synthesis of dodecahedrane. The first step involved reductive dimerization of the molecule to give dihydrofulvalene, not simple addition to give dicyclopentadiene.

Uses
Aside from serving as a precursor to cyclopentadienyl-based catalysts, the main commercial application of cyclopentadiene is as a precursor to comonomers.  Semi-hydrogenation gives cyclopentene.  Diels–Alder reaction with butadiene gives ethylidene norbornene, a comonomer in the production of EPDM rubbers.

Derivatives

Cyclopentadiene can substitute one or more hydrogens, forming derivatives having covalent bonds:
Bulky cyclopentadienes
Calicene
Cyclopentadienone
Di-tert-butylcyclopentadiene
Methylcyclopentadiene
Pentamethylcyclopentadiene
Pentacyanocyclopentadiene

Most of these substituted cyclopentadienes can also form anions, and join cyclopentadienyl complexes.

See also
Aromaticity

References

External links
International Chemical Safety Card 0857
NIOSH Pocket Guide to Chemical Hazards

 
Annulenes
Five-membered rings